Coothill is a hamlet in Saskatchewan.

Unincorporated communities in Saskatchewan
Martin No. 122, Saskatchewan
Division No. 5, Saskatchewan